Jack Spicer may refer to:

 Jack Spicer, American poet
 Jack Spicer (Xiaolin Showdown), a character from the animated television show Xiaolin Showdown

See also
John Spicer (disambiguation)